Benthimermithidae is a family of nematodes belonging to the order Benthimermithida.

Genera:
 Adenodelphis Petter, 1983
 Bathynema Miljutin & Miljutina, 2009
 Trophomera Rubtzov & Platonova, 1974

References

Nematodes